Welcome to JFK is the debut studio album by American hip hop recording artist Chinx. It was released on August 14, 2015, by Entertainment One Music, Coke Boys Records, Riot Squad and NuSense Music Group. It was released posthumously following his death on May 17, 2015.

Singles
The album's lead single, called "On Your Body" featuring Meet Sims, was released on June 2, 2015. On July 28, 2015, the music video was released for "On Your Body" featuring Meet Sims.

Critical reception

Welcome to JFK received generally positive reviews from music critics. Keith Nelson Jr. of HipHopDX said, "Welcome to JFK will forever shrouded in “What if’s,” even if Chinx’s management promises future projects. But, in the end, Chinx crafted a debut album strong enough to support springboarding him into creative areas we never did, and never will, see him reach." David Jeffries of AllMusic said, "A well-rounded effort with plenty of promise, the posthumous Welcome to JFK is one bittersweet victory."

Commercial performance
The album debuted at number 21 on the Billboard 200, selling 14,600 copies in the United States.

Track listing
Album credits adapted from official liner notes.

Personnel

Performers
 Chinx – primary artist
 Stack Bundles – featured artist 
 Ty Dolla Sign – featured artist 
 Jeremih – featured artist 
 Meet Sims – featured artist 
 Nipsey Hussle – featured artist 
 Zack – featured artist 
 French Montana – featured artist 

Production
 Young Stokes – producer 
 Roc da Producer – producer 
 Austin Powerz – producer 
 Blickie Blaze – producer 
 Remo the Hitmaker – producer 
 Lee on the Beats – producer 
 K-Beatz – producer 
 Bkorn – producer 
 OZ – producer 

Technical
 Doug Ellison – mixing 
 Alex DeYoung – mastering 
 Young Stokes – recording 
 A Kid Named Cus – mixing 
 Derwin Armstrong – mixing 
 Blickie Blaze – recording 
 Bob Horn – mixing

Charts

References

2015 debut albums
Chinx albums
E1 Music albums
Albums published posthumously